Guillermo Antonio García Morel (born April 4, 1972 in Cabrera, María Trinidad Sánchez, Dominican Republic) is a former Major League Baseball catcher.

External links

1964 births
Living people
Acereros de Monclova players
Cafeteros de Córdoba players
Camden Riversharks players
Capital City Bombers players
Chattanooga Lookouts players
Cincinnati Reds players
Dominican Republic expatriate baseball players in Mexico
Dominican Republic expatriate baseball players in the United States
Florida Marlins players
Guerreros de Oaxaca players
Gulf Coast Mets players
Indianapolis Indians players
Kingsport Mets players
Louisville RiverBats players
Major League Baseball catchers
Major League Baseball players from the Dominican Republic
Mexican League baseball catchers
Mexican League baseball first basemen
Mexican League baseball right fielders
Mexican League baseball third basemen
New Haven Ravens players
People from Santiago de los Caballeros
Pittsfield Mets players
Rochester Red Wings players
St. Lucie Mets players
Tigres de la Angelopolis players
Tigres del México players
Winston-Salem Warthogs players